Tahari Lewis (born 21 April 1986 in Antigua and Barbuda) is Antiguan footballer. He plays for home town club All Saints United in Antigua and Barbuda Premier Division. He was called to Antigua and Barbuda national football team at friendly match against Trinidad and Tobago.

References

External links 
 

1986 births
Living people
Antigua and Barbuda footballers
Antigua and Barbuda international footballers
Association football goalkeepers